The 2009–10 Croatian Football Cup was the nineteenth season of Croatia's football knockout competition.

The defending champions were Dinamo Zagreb since they won the previous year's cup by defeating Hajduk Split on penalties after the result was tied 3–3 on aggregate.

The cup kicked off with the single-legged preliminary round which was played on 25 and 26 August 2009. Top flight clubs entered the competition in the following round, played on 22 and 23 September 2009. The two-legged final was played on 21 April and 5 May 2010, and was contested by Šibenik and Hajduk Split.

This was the first cup final for Šibenik, and a first time that they had passed through beyond the second round in the Croatian Cup. Hajduk Split won their fifth cup in nine finals. It was their first cup triumph in seven years since 2003 and their first silverware overall in five years since their 2004–05 Croatian championship title.

This was the first time that two Dalmatian clubs had reached the Croatian Cup final.

Calendar

Preliminary round
The draw for the preliminary round was held on 12 August, and matches were held on 25 and 26 August 2009. This round consisted of 16 single-legged fixtures.

* Matches played on 25 August.

First round
The draw for the first round proper was held on 27 August, and matches were held on 22 and 23 September 2009.

Second round
The matches were played on 27 and 28 October 2009.

* Although Dinamo were seeded as hosts, they agreed to play the match at Vinogradar's ground at Mladina near Jastrebarsko.

Quarter-finals
The draw was held on 3 November. First legs were held on 25 November and second legs on 9 December 2009.

|}

Semi-finals

First legs

Second legs

Šibenik won 2–0 on aggregate

Hajduk Split won 1–0 on aggregate

Final

First leg

Second leg

Hajduk Split win 4–1 on aggregate.

See also
2009–10 Croatian First Football League
2009–10 Croatian Second Football League

References

External links
Official website 

Croatian Football Cup seasons
Croatia
Croatian Cup, 2009-10